Procaris noelensis is a species of shrimp, a single specimen having been described by Bruce & Davie from a freshwater/tidally influenced cave system on Christmas Island in 2006.

This species is widely separated geographically from other members of its genus and may be a relict species from the Mesozoic fauna of the Tethys Ocean, with Christmas Island being its refugium. This theory is reinforced by the fact that it was found living in sympatry with a hippolytid shrimp and an atyid shrimp, the latter coming from another ancient lineage and often found inhabiting anchialine systems.

Distribution
Procaris is a small genus of aberrant shrimps with only five known members. Previously three of these Procaris ascensionis, Procaris chacei and Procaris mexicana were known only from their type locations in the Atlantic Ocean, and one, Procaris hawaiana, was known only from Hawaii in the Pacific Ocean, so the discovery in 2006 of Procaris noelensis at Christmas Island was the first member of the genus identified from the Indian Ocean. This species is known from a single female individual, the holotype, found in an anchialine cave where saltwater intrudes into the karst limestone.

References

Decapods
Fauna of Christmas Island
Crustaceans described in 2006